Jessie Belle Hardy Stubbs MacKaye (1876 – April 18, 1921) was president of the Milwaukee Women's Peace Society.

Biography
Hardy Stubbs MacKaye was the daughter of Major A. L. Hardy of Pittsburgh, a notable newspaper reporter for the Chicago Times.

She was the head surgical nurse at St. Luke’s hospital in Chicago and met her first husband, Dr. F. Gurney Stubbs there. Dr. Stubbs passed away from pneumonia in 1910 and Hardy Stubbs moved to New York City afterward, attending Columbia University’s School of Philanthropy and becoming the legislative chair of the Women's Peace Society.

She was noted for "urging all women to remain unmarried or to refuse to bear children" to express the seriousness of female suffrage.

In 1915, she married Benton MacKaye. Jessie died by suicide in 1921 by drowning herself in the East River. While grieving her death, husband Benton MacKaye began formulating the idea that became the Appalachian Trail, as his wife had loved long-distance walking and hiking.

References

1876 births
1921 suicides
Columbia University School of Social Work alumni
American women's rights activists
American feminists
American suffragists
American pacifists
Suicides by drowning in the United States
Suicides in New York City